Luke Frost is a British abstract painter living in Cornwall, and is the son of the English painter Anthony Frost and the grandson of Sir Terry Frost.

His work featured in the "Art Now Cornwall" exhibition, at Tate St Ives, 2007, and he was Artist in Residence at Tate St Ives in 2008 following with a solo show from 24 January to 4 May 2009 .

See also 

 List of St. Ives artists
 Anthony Frost
 Terry Frost

External links
Artists website
Guardian/Seen Cornwall feature
Essays on Luke Frost by Matthew Collings, Tony Godfrey, Susan Daniel-McElroy, Michael Klein and others

Year of birth missing (living people)
Living people
Artists from Cornwall
20th-century English painters
English male painters
21st-century English painters
21st-century English male artists
Abstract expressionist artists
St Ives artists
20th-century English male artists